Dennis the Wild Bull is a children's book co-written by NBA Hall of Famer Dennis Rodman and Dustin Warburton and illustrated by Dan Monroe.  It is written in rhyme with many color illustrations.

Plot
The story is about a bull named Dennis who is captured for the rodeo, but escapes back into the wild.  He befriends a couple of other bulls at the rodeo, a Mexican and a White, and takes them with him when he returns to his family.  Rodman described the book as showing that it is "OK to be different".

Reception
Dennis the Wild Bull was the most anticipated children's book of 2012.  It was featured on the Tonight Show with Jay Leno and the Late Night with Jimmy Fallon.

See also

 List of American children's books

References

Further reading
 

2012 children's books
American picture books
Children's and young adult literature articles needing infoboxes